Manuel Alberto Mendoza Rezabala (born January 19, 1989 in Portoviejo) is an Ecuadorian football goalkeeper  who plays for Técnico Universitario.

Club career
Mendoza has been playing professionally for LDU Portoviejo in recent times although he has not been a regular. He is expected to play more games for his club because of the stellar performance in the 2009 South American Youth Championship.

In December 2009, he transferred to LDU Quito.

International career
Mendoza played a starting rolein Ecuador's participation in the 2009 South American Youth Championship. He had great performances for Ecuador's campaign. Against Peru he was close to saving a penalty from Reimond Manco. Mendoza kept two clean-sheets against Venezuela and Colombia. In the game against Argentina, he made an error, along with the defense, and Argentina tied the game 2–2 in the last minutes of the game. Ecuador would be eliminated from the tournament by coin toss, despite a respectable campaign.

Mendoza received a call-up to the senior team in early February 2009 for an unofficial friendly against England's U-21 team. He was an unused substitute and didn't play in Ecuador's 3–2 win.

References

External links
Mendoza's FEF player card 

1989 births
Living people
People from Portoviejo
Association football goalkeepers
Ecuadorian footballers
Ecuador international footballers
L.D.U. Portoviejo footballers
C.D. Técnico Universitario footballers